Anessa Ramsey is an American actress and film producer.  Ramsey starred in The Signal (2007), YellowBrickRoad (2010), and Rites of Spring (2011).

Career 
Heather Wixson of Dread Central called her "one of the finest actresses working in independent film these days".  Ramsey began acting at 17.  Her first starring role was in The Signal with Justin Welborn and A. J. Bowen.  The three had worked extensively with co-directors David Bruckner, Jacob Gentry, and Dan Bush in Atlanta-based productions previously.  Her next starring role was in YellowBrickRoad.  The directors, Jesse Holland and Andy Mitton, were fans of The Signal and cast Ramsey based on her performance in that film.  Ramsey was offered the option of co-producing the film, which she said that she enjoyed.  She said that she was drawn to the film based on the setting.  In Rites of Spring, she starred as a flawed heroine, which she said was an important part of the characterization for her.  She was also interested in appearing in a creature feature.  Ramsey performed her own stunts.  John Anderson of Variety wrote that Rites of Spring "has a terrific actress in Anessa Ramsey, who's that rare thing in horror, a thoroughly-convincing victim."  In 2013, she appeared in a small role in Devil's Knot, and, in 2015, she appeared in the horror anthology Southbound.  In 2017, she starred in Roger Corman's Death Race 2050 as Tammy the Terrorist.

Filmography

References

External links 
 

Living people
21st-century American actresses
American film actresses
American television actresses
American women film producers
American film producers
1978 births